Mallory A. Kass (born July 21, 1984), better known by the pen name Kass Morgan, is an American author and editor, best known as the author of The 100, a dystopian science fiction book series for young adult readers. She attended Brown University, studying English and History, and later earned a Master's at Oxford in 19th century literature. She currently lives in New York City and works as a senior editor at Scholastic. She appeared as a contestant on Jeopardy! on May 10, 2022.

Bibliography

The 100 series

The 100 (2013)
Day 21 (2014)
Homecoming (2015)
Rebellion (2016)

Light Years series
Light Years (2018)
Supernova (2019)

The Ravens series
This series is written with Danielle Paige
The Ravens (2020)
The Monarchs (2022)

References

External links
 

1984 births
Living people
21st-century American writers
21st-century American women writers
American editors
Brown University alumni
Alumni of the University of Oxford
21st-century pseudonymous writers
Pseudonymous women writers
Jeopardy! contestants